Michael Trigg (born June 27, 2002) is an American football tight end for the Ole Miss Rebels of the Southeastern Conference. He previously played for the USC Trojans.

Early life and high school
Trigg grew up in Tampa, Florida and initially attended Seffner Christian Academy. He had  82 receptions for 1,232 yards with 16 touchdown receptions as a junior. Trigg transferred to Carrollwood Day School prior to his senior year. Trigg caught 30 passes for 586 yards and five touchdowns in seven games during his senior season. He committed to play college football at USC after considering offers from LSU and South Carolina. Trigg was also considered to be a Division I prospect in basketball.

College career
Trigg began his collegiate career at USC. He caught seven passes for 109 yards and a touchdown as a freshman. Following the end of the season, Trigg entered the NCAA transfer portal.

Trigg ultimately transferred to Ole Miss.

References

External links
USC Trojans bio
Ole Miss Rebels bio

Living people
American football tight ends
USC Trojans football players
Ole Miss Rebels football players
Players of American football from Tampa, Florida
Year of birth missing (living people)